William Lamb, 2nd Viscount Melbourne, in some sources called Henry William Lamb,  (15 March 177924 November 1848) was a Whig politician who served as the Home Secretary and twice as the Prime Minister of the United Kingdom. 

His first premiership ended when he was dismissed by William IV in 1834, the last British prime minister to be dismissed by a monarch. Five months later, he was re-appointed and served for six more years, into the reign of Queen Victoria. He is best known for coaching the Queen in the ways of politics, acting almost as her private secretary. His legacy as prime minister was not favourable, as he had no great foreign wars or domestic issues to handle, and he was involved in several political scandals in the early years of Victoria's reign.

Early life
In 1779, William Lamb was born in London to an aristocratic Whig family, and was the son of the Penistone and Elizabeth Lamb (1751–1818). However, his paternity was questioned, being attributed to George Wyndham, 3rd Earl of Egremont, to whom it was considered he bore a considerable resemblance, and at whose residence he was a visitor until the Earl's death. Lamb was called to Egremont's bedside when Egremont was dying but, nevertheless, stated that Egremont being his father was 'all a lie'.He was educated at Eton, then at Trinity College, Cambridge, where he was admitted in 1796 and graduated a Master of Arts in 1799, and finally at the University of Glasgow (1799–1801), where he was a resident pupil of Professor John Millar alongside his younger brother Frederick. 

Admitted to Lincoln's Inn in 1797, he was called to the bar in 1804. Against the background of the Napoleonic Wars, Lamb served at home as Captain (1803) and Major (1804) in the Hertfordshire Volunteer Infantry.

He succeeded his elder brother Peniston as heir to his father's title in 1805 (and as captain of the Midland Troop, Hertfordshire Yeomanry, when he resigned his commission in the Volunteer Infantry) and married Lady Caroline Ponsonby, an Anglo-Irish aristocrat. After two miscarriages, she gave birth to George Augustus Frederick in 1807 and was devoted to him. He was epileptic and mentally handicapped, requiring significant medical care. He died in 1836.

The following year, Lamb was elected to the British House of Commons as the Whig MP for Leominster. For the election in 1806 he moved to the seat of Haddington Burghs, and for the 1807 election he successfully stood for Portarlington (a seat he held until 1812).

Lamb first came to general notice for reasons he would rather have avoided: his wife had a public affair with Lord Byron — she coined the famous characterisation of Byron as "mad, bad and dangerous to know". The resulting scandal was the talk of Britain in 1812. 

Lady Caroline published a Gothic novel, Glenarvon, in 1816; this portrayed both the marriage and her affair with Byron in a lurid fashion, which caused William even greater embarrassment, while the spiteful caricatures of leading society figures made them several influential enemies. Eventually the two were reconciled, and, though they separated in 1825, her death in 1828 affected him considerably.

Early politics

Member of Parliament

In 1816, Lamb was returned for Peterborough by Whig grandee Lord Fitzwilliam. He told Lord Holland that he was committed to the Whig principles of the Glorious Revolution but not to "a heap of modern additions, interpolations, facts and fictions". He, therefore, spoke against parliamentary reform, and voted for the suspension of habeas corpus in 1817 when sedition was rife.

Lamb's hallmark was finding the middle ground. Though a Whig, he accepted the post of Chief Secretary for Ireland in the moderate Tory governments of George Canning and Lord Goderich on 29 April 1827. Upon the death of his father in 1828 and his becoming the 2nd Viscount Melbourne, of Kilmore in the County of Cavan, he moved to the House of Lords. He had spent 25 years in the Commons, largely as a backbencher, and was not politically well known.

Home Secretary
In November 1830, the Whigs came to power under Lord Grey. Melbourne was Home Secretary. During the disturbances of 1830–32 he "acted both vigorously and sensitively, and it was for this function that his reforming brethren thanked him heartily". In the aftermath of the Swing Riots of 1830–31, he countered the Tory magistrates' alarmism by refusing to resort to military force; instead, he advocated magistrates' usual powers be fully enforced, along with special constables and financial rewards for the arrest of rioters and rabble-rousers. He appointed a special commission to try approximately 1,000 of those arrested, and ensured that justice was strictly adhered to: one-third were acquitted and most of the one-fifth sentenced to death were instead transported. There remains controversy regarding the hanging of Dic Penderyn, a protester in the Merthyr Rising who was then, and is now, widely judged to have been innocent. He appears to have been executed solely on the word of Melbourne, who sought a victim in order to 'set an example'. The disturbances over reform in 1831–32 were countered with the enforcement of the usual laws; again, Melbourne refused to pass emergency legislation against sedition.

Melbourne supported the 1834 prosecution and transportation of the Tolpuddle Martyrs to Australia for their attempts to protest against the cutting of agricultural wages.

Prime Minister

After Lord Grey resigned as Prime Minister in July 1834, William IV was forced to appoint another Whig to replace him, as the Tories were not strong enough to support a government. Melbourne, who was the man most likely to be both acceptable to the King and hold the Whig party together, hesitated after receiving from Grey a letter from the King requesting Melbourne to visit him to discuss the formation of a government. Melbourne feared he would not enjoy the extra work that accompanied the office of Premier, but he did not want to let his friends and party down. According to Charles Greville, Melbourne said to his secretary, Tom Young: "I think it's a damned bore. I am in many minds as to what to do". Young replied: "Why, damn it all, such a position was never held by any Greek or Roman: and if it only lasts three months, it will be worthwhile to have been Prime Minister of England." "By God, that's true", Melbourne said, "I'll go!"

Compromise was the key to many of Melbourne's actions. He was personally opposed to the 1832 Reform Act proposed by the Whigs and later opposed the repeal of the Corn Laws but reluctantly agreed to both.

Melbourne was also a strong supporter of slavery, calling Britain's abolition of slavery a "great folly" and if he had had his own way (as opposed to what many Whigs wanted), he would "have done nothing at all!"

King William IV's opposition to the Whigs' reforming ways led him to dismiss Melbourne in November. He then gave the Tories under Sir Robert Peel an opportunity to form a government. Peel's failure to win a House of Commons majority in the resulting general election (January 1835) made it impossible for him to govern, and the Whigs returned to power under Melbourne that April. This was the last time a British monarch attempted to appoint a government to suit his own preferences.

Blackmail 
The next year, Melbourne was once again involved in a sex scandal. This time he was the victim of attempted blackmail from the husband of a close friend, society beauty and author Caroline Norton. The husband demanded £1,400, and when he was turned down he accused Melbourne of having an affair with his wife. At that time such a scandal would have been enough to derail a major politician, so it is a measure of the respect contemporaries had for his integrity that Melbourne's government did not fall. The king and the Duke of Wellington urged him to stay on as prime minister. After Norton failed in court, Melbourne was vindicated, but he did stop seeing Caroline Norton.

Nonetheless, as historian Boyd Hilton concludes, "it is irrefutable that Melbourne's personal life was problematic. Spanking sessions with aristocratic ladies were harmless, not so the whippings administered to orphan girls taken into his household as objects of charity".

Queen Victoria
Melbourne was Prime Minister when Queen Victoria came to the throne (June 1837). Barely eighteen, she was only just breaking free from the domineering influence of her mother, the Duchess of Kent, and her mother's adviser, Sir John Conroy. Over the next four years, Melbourne trained her in the art of politics, and the two became friends: Victoria was quoted as saying she considered him like a father (her own had died when she was only eight months old), and Melbourne's son had died at a young age. Melbourne was given a private apartment at Windsor Castle, and unfounded rumours circulated for a time that Victoria would marry Melbourne, 40 years her senior. Tutoring Victoria was the climax of Melbourne's career: the prime minister spent four to five hours a day visiting and writing to her, and she responded with enthusiasm.

Lord Melbourne's tutoring of Victoria took place against a background of two potentially damaging political events: first, the Lady Flora Hastings affair, followed not long after by the Bedchamber Crisis. Victoria's reputation suffered in an 1839 court intrigue when Hastings, one of her mother's ladies-in-waiting, developed an abdominal growth that was widely rumoured to be an out-of-wedlock pregnancy by Sir John Conroy. Victoria believed the rumours, as did Lord Melbourne. When Victoria told Melbourne of her suspicions, he planted the idea in her head that her mother, the Duchess of Kent, was jealous of Hasting's closeness to Conroy, which made Victoria excited and more resolute on the matter. Initially, Melbourne "suggested quiet watchfulness" over Hastings's body changes. But after the court physician, Sir James Clarke, had examined Hastings and generally concluded she wasn't pregnant, Melbourne was wholly persuaded Hastings must be pregnant from a throwaway comment that Clarke made about the appearance of virginity in spite of pregnancy. Melbourne immediately informed the queen. When Victoria observed to him that Hastings had not been seen in public for a while because "she was so sick," Melbourne "repeated, 'Sick?' with what the queen described as 'a significant laugh. 

Chartism took its name from the People's Charter of 1838 and was a working-class movement for parliamentary reform. The Chartists also fought against the New Poor Law of 1834. In June 1839, the petition, signed by 1.3 million working people, was presented to the House of Commons, but MPs voted not to hear the petitioners.

The Rebellions of 1837–1838 led directly to Lord Durham's Report on the Affairs of British North America and to The British North America Act, 1840 which established a new political entity, the Province of Canada.

The Whig cabinet under Melbourne decided on 1 October 1839 to send an expeditionary force to China to protect British interests. The First Opium War was fought between China and the United Kingdom from 1839 to 1842, one of the outcomes of the war was that Hong Kong would be ceded to the UK and become a British crown colony.

The First Anglo-Afghan War occurred between 1839 and 1842. At the beginning of the conflict, the East India Company troops had defeated the forces of Afghan Emir and in 1839 occupied Kabul.

The Treaty of Waitangi was signed on 6 February 1840 by representatives of the British Crown and Māori chiefs. In November 1840 a royal charter was signed by Queen Victoria, establishing New Zealand as a Crown colony.

Rule and resign 

On 7 May 1839, Melbourne announced his intention to resign, which began a series of events that led to the Bedchamber Crisis. Prospective prime minister Robert Peel requested that Victoria dismiss some of the wives and daughters of Whig MPs who made up her personal entourage, arguing that the monarch should avoid any hint of favouritism to a party out of power. The Queen refused to comply—supported by Melbourne, although he was unaware that Peel had not requested the resignation of all the Queen's ladies as she had led him to believe—and hence, Peel refused to form a new government, and Melbourne was persuaded to stay on as Prime Minister.

Among his government's Acts were a reduction in the number of capital offences, reforms of local government, and the reform of the Poor laws. This restricted the terms on which the poor were allowed relief and established compulsory admission to workhouses for the impoverished.

On 25 February 1841, Melbourne was admitted as a Fellow of the Royal Society.

Following a vote of no confidence initiated by Conservative MP John Stuart-Wortley, Melbourne's government fell, and he resigned as Prime Minister on 30 August 1841.

Later life

After Melbourne resigned permanently in August 1841, Victoria continued to write to him about political matters, but as it was deemed inappropriate after a time their letters became cordial and non-political without issue. It has been observed that Melbourne's role faded as Victoria increasingly relied on her new husband Prince Albert. Though weakened, Melbourne survived a stroke on 23 October 1842, fourteen months after his departure from politics. In retirement, he lived at Brocket Hall, Hertfordshire. He died at home on 24 November 1848 and was buried nearby at St Etheldreda's Church, Hatfield, Hertfordshire. There is a memorial to him in St Paul's Cathedral.

Upon his death, his titles passed to his brother, Frederick, as his son, George Augustus Frederick (1807–1836), the only child to survive birth after Lady Caroline's two miscarriages, had predeceased him.

Legacy
 Melbourne, the capital city of Victoria, Australia, was named in his honour in March 1837. He was the Prime Minister of the United Kingdom at the time.
Mount Melbourne, a stratovolcano in Antarctica, was also named in his honour by the British naval officer and explorer James Clark Ross, in 1841.

In literature
Letitia Elizabeth Landon's poetical illustration Lord Melbourne, to a portrait by Thomas Lawrence, was published in Fisher's Drawing Room Scrap Book, 1837. It is one of the few instances in which she allowed herself a political comment.

In popular culture
On screen, Lord Melbourne has been portrayed by several actors:
 Rufus Sewell in the UK TV series Victoria.
 Paul Bettany in The Young Victoria (2009)
 Nigel Hawthorne in Victoria & Albert (2001)
 Joseph O'Conor in Edward the Seventh (1975)
 Jon Finch in the film Lady Caroline Lamb (1972)
 Karl Ludwig Diehl in the Austrian film Victoria in Dover (1954)

References

Bibliography 

 Cecil, David (1954).  major biography focused on his psychology
 
 
 Hibbert, Christopher (2000) Queen Victoria: A Personal History, London: HarperCollins,

Further reading
 
 
 Cecil, David. "Melbourne and the Years of Reform." History Today (Aug 1954) 4#8 pp 529–536.

Collected papers

External links

 
 
 More about William Lamb, Viscount Melbourne on the Downing Street website
 Historica's Heritage Minute video docudrama "Responsible Government" (Adobe Flash Player)
 
 
 About William's Notorious Wife, Lady Caroline

1779 births
1848 deaths
19th-century prime ministers of the United Kingdom
Alumni of Trinity College, Cambridge
Burials in Hertfordshire
Fellows of the Royal Society
Members of the Privy Council of the United Kingdom
Members of the Privy Council of Ireland
Members of the Parliament of the United Kingdom for Hertfordshire
Members of the Parliament of the United Kingdom for Portarlington
People educated at Eton College
Hertfordshire Yeomanry officers
People of the Victorian era
Prime Ministers of the United Kingdom
Secretaries of State for the Home Department
UK MPs 1806–1807
UK MPs 1807–1812
UK MPs 1812–1818
UK MPs 1818–1820
UK MPs 1820–1826
UK MPs 1826–1830
UK MPs who inherited peerages
Viscounts Melbourne
Younger sons of viscounts
Whig (British political party) MPs for English constituencies
Chief Secretaries for Ireland
Whig prime ministers of the United Kingdom
British monarchists
Leaders of the House of Lords
Whig (British political party) MPs for Irish constituencies